Son of Scarface: A Memoir by the Grandson of Al Capone is an autobiography by Chris W. Knight, who alleges that his father was the hidden son of Al Capone gangster Al Capone.

Synopsis 
The autobiography chronicles the author’s broken childhood as he uncovers family secrets that his abusive mother attempted to keep him and his sister from pursuing.

As an adult he seeks the truth about both his grandfather and his father, who used a fraudulent birth certificate. After years of genealogical research and interviews of close family friends Chris Knight concludes that his father is a hidden son of Al Capone.

Author 
Chris W. Knight.

References 

Organized crime memoirs
American autobiographies
Works about Al Capone
Works about the Chicago Outfit
2007 non-fiction books